Farah Dagogo (born 29 November 1982) is a Nigerian politician.
Hon. Dagogo was born in Port Harcourt. In 2019 he was elected as the representative of Degema/Bonny Federal Constituency in Rivers State for the People's Democratic Party. Prior to this he served as a lawmaker in the Rivers State House of representative.

Background 
Hon. Farah Dagogo holds a BSc in Sociology.

Before entering politics, he was a MEND field commander. He surrendered his weapons and accepted a government amnesty on 6 August 2009.

Political career 
Hon. Dagogo was elected to the Nigerian National House of Representatives in the general election of 2019 and was inaugurated on 29 May 2019.

Previously, he served as a lawmaker in the Rivers State House of Assembly Representing Degema Constituency. During this time he was the chair for the House committee on Education, focusing on the diversification of Rivers State University subject focus and upon funding sources for the states wider education system. He has also addressed issues regarding climate change and environmental degradation in the Niger Delta.

References 

Peoples Democratic Party (Nigeria) politicians
1982 births
People from Rivers State
Members of the House of Representatives (Nigeria) from Rivers State
Members of the Rivers State House of Assembly
Living people